The United States Fencing Association (USFA) is the national governing body for the sport of fencing in the United States. The USFA was founded in 1891 as the Amateur Fencers League of America (AFLA) by a group of New York fencers seeking independence from the Amateur Athletic Union. The AFLA changed its name to the United States Fencing Association in 1981.

The USFA was incorporated as a non-profit corporation in Pennsylvania in 1964 and in Colorado in 1993, in compliance with the Olympic and Amateur Sports Act. It opened its national office at the Olympic Training Center in Colorado Springs, Colorado in August 1982. The national office moved from the Olympic Training Center to downtown Colorado Springs in 2002. The USFA's first full-time Executive Director was hired in 1983.

The USFA is affiliated with the Fédération Internationale d'Escrime (FIE), the international federation for fencing founded in Paris in 1913.

History
The organization was founded on April 22, 1891, in New York City, initially as the Amateur Fencers League of America (AFLA). Graeme Hammond was its first president, from 1891 to 1925. The AFLA was incorporated as a non-profit corporation in Pennsylvania in 1964, and changed its name to the United States Fencing Association in 1981. It was incorporated in Colorado in 1993 in compliance with the Olympic and Amateur Sports Act. The organization opened its national office at the Olympic Training Center in Colorado Springs, Colorado, in 1982. The national office subsequently moved from the Olympic Training Center to downtown Colorado Springs in 2002.

On March 10, 2023, USA Fencing announced they would vote against reinstating Russian and Belarusian athletes during the International Fencing Federation (FIE) Extraordinary Congress. Athletes from those two countries were suspended a year earlier after Russia's full-scale invasion of Ukraine. USA Fencing provided the further comment:

Despite USA Fencing's advocacy, more than 60% of nations affiliated with the FIE voted to reinstate fencers and officials from Russia and Belarus and allow them to compete in international fencing competition. USA Fencing stated they are "disappointed, frustrated and disturbed — though not all that surprised — at the outcome of today’s vote" and that "today’s “yes” vote by more than 80 delegates, while not a direct endorsement of Russia's war, does send a message to the world that a majority of the international fencing community is ready to look the other way and welcome back fencers funded by and supported by the Russian government."

Ratings
The USFA tracks ratings for its members. Ratings are a system of classification for USFA fencers; they are primarily used to seed tournaments, but are also considered to be (very) broad indicators of skill.  When a fencer first joins the USFA, he or she will have a classification of "U", or "Unrated." There are six different ratings in the USFA those being U (the lowest rating), E, D, C, B, A (the highest rating). Fencers may increase their classification—from U to E, and then up to A—by placing in USFA-sanctioned tournaments. A tournament must have a certain number of competitors, and those competitors must maintain a certain ratio of classifications, for the top fencers to be eligible for ratings.

Championship

Hall of Fame
The United States Fencing Hall of Fame (or "U.S. Fencing Association Hall of Fame") is a hall of fame for fencers. It is located in the Museum of American Fencing in Shreveport, Louisiana. It was founded as the National Fencing Coaches Association Hall of Fame on February 15, 1963, and was previously located at Helms Sports Hall of Fame, founded in 1936 in Los Angeles, California.

No one was inducted into the Fencing Hall of Fame during the years 1975–1994, due to physical moves and organizational changes, including its takeover by the Amateur Athletic Foundation.

Through September 2021, US fencers had won 33 Olympic medals and 38 World Championships medals.

Inductees

Controversy
Two-time Olympian Nzingha Prescod was elected as an athlete director on the USA Fencing Board of Directors beginning on January 1, 2021, as the top vote-getter in a vote by athletes who represented the U.S. at the Olympics or Paralympics, Pan American Games, or Senior World Championships. Prescod stated that in 2020 the organization's disciplinary decisions "reeked of lenience and favorability for the offender."

In 2021, when fencer Alen Hadzic was permitted to go to the Tokyo Olympics after an arbitrator reduced his sanction of temporary suspension following an investigation prompted by rape and other sexual misconduct allegations against him, his Team USA teammates expressed concerns for their safety and well-being arising from his presence, according to USA Fencing. USA Fencing therefore prohibited him from staying at his teammates' hotel. Hadzic's lawyer said USA Fencing had known of the allegations made by the three women against Hadzic "for years," but until the Olympics had never put a restriction in place for Hadzic while he competed all over the world with USA Fencing teams. Hadzic therefore sought to overturn the restriction in arbitration, without any success. He had previously been suspended by Columbia University for a year for sexual misconduct, as a result of the findings of a Title IX investigation of his behavior. By October 2021, a total of at least six sexual misconduct complaints, including rape, had been filed against Hadzic. USA Fencing's website in 2022 stated the following about the Hadzic situation: "We understand that many in the USA Fencing community will question Alen Hadzic’s inclusion on our 2022 Senior World Team, given that he is still under investigation by the U.S. Center for SafeSport — an independent body separate from USA Fencing. We had hoped for a swifter resolution to this investigation, which has now stretched on for more than a year. We share in the frustration of fencers and fencing fans. The U.S. Center for SafeSport has the exclusive authority to adjudicate reports of alleged sexual abuse and sexual misconduct. As long as the outcome of this investigation remains unresolved, USA Fencing is obligated to allow Hadzic to compete internationally. But we have taken decisive action where we can. For the past year, we have implemented a safety plan designed to protect athletes, coaches and staff at all tournaments at which Hadzic has been a participant. While we await the conclusion of this protracted investigation, we will continue to put the safety of our athletes, coaches and staff above all else."

During the Hadzic scandal, it was disclosed by the press in 2021 that USA Fencing had received a sexual assault complaint about Hadzic by a fellow USA Fencing fencer in 2013, but not acted on it. The lawyer for the complainant had written to former CEO Kris Ekeren in 2013: "How can the [US Fencing Association], in good conscience, claim its hands are tied and permit the participation of a known rapist into its athletic midst?" However, Ekeren did not respond further to the lawyer, and the letters were not made public for eight years. In the wake of that disclosure, the USA Fencing's Executive Director/CEO Kris Ekeren and General Counsel Jim Neale both resigned.

In August 2022, a lawsuit was filed against USA Fencing, alleging that its officials knew that fencing coach Robert Piraino was engaging in sexually abusive behavior, but that the organization failed to act before the fencing coach then sexually abused a 13-year-old girl and a 17-year-old boy. In a federal criminal action against him, Piraino was sentenced to 25 years in prison.

See also
Collegiate fencing
U.S. Fencing Coaches Association

References

External links

National members of the Panamerican Fencing Confederation
Fencing
Fencing organizations
Fencing in the United States
Sports organizations established in 1891
1891 establishments in the United States	
Organizations based in Colorado Springs, Colorado
Sports rules and regulations